Slightly Single in L.A. is an American romantic comedy film, written and directed by Christie Will and starring Lacey Chabert, Kip Pardue, Haylie Duff, Carly Schroeder, Jenna Dewan, and Jonathan Bennett.  The film was released in December 2012.

Cast
 Lacey Chabert as Dale Squire, the main protagonist
 Kip Pardue as Zach, Dale's love interest
 Jenna Dewan as Hallie, One of Dale's best girl friends
 Carly Schroeder as Becca, One of Dale's best girl friends
 Jonathan Bennett as Seven, Dale's best friend
 Haylie Duff as Jill, Dale's other best friend
 Mircea Monroe as CeCe, a friend of Zach's
 Chris Kattan as Drew, Jill's fiancé
 Simon Rex as J.P., a photographer that Dale sleeps with from time to time

Plot
Dale (Chabert) a television producer for a reality TV show, has had a poor history of dating.  So she moves to Los Angeles, and just enjoys hanging out with friends, and has sworn off dating.  That is until an old friend from many years ago (Pardue) reappears in her life.

Production
The film was shot on location in Los Angeles, California. Production used various restaurants, parks, homes, and clubs in Los Angeles for some of the film, including the Les Deux and Wonderland nightclubs. The film was produced by Helios Productions, along with Most/Rice Films and Imprint Entertainment.

Music
Original music which accompanied the film includes The Aaron Hendra Project and Charly (21st Century Girl).

References

External links
 Helios Productions website
 

2012 films
American romantic comedy films
Films scored by Michael Tavera
2012 romantic comedy films
Films set in Los Angeles
2010s English-language films
2010s American films